Lake Pomacocha (possibly from Quechua puma cougar, puma, qucha lake, "puma lake") is a lake in Peru located in the Ayacucho Region, Vilcas Huamán Province. at a height of about 3,300 m. It is situated southwest of the town of Vischongo. Pomacocha is 0.86 km long and 0.17 km at its widest point. The archaeological site called Inti Watana or Pomacocha lies at its shore.

See also
 List of lakes in Peru
 Titankayuq
 Usnu

References

External links 

Lakes of Peru
Lakes of Ayacucho Region